David Calabrese (born April 4, 1964), known professionally as Dr. Chud, is an American horror punk drummer best known for his work with the Misfits.

Life and career 
Born in Lodi, New Jersey, Dr. Chud attended Lodi High School. His career began playing with Dan Kidney and the Pulsations for seven years (1987–1994). During the early 1990s, Dr. Chud did a lot of studio sessions with various artist, including Specific Ocean and Sardonica. He also recorded an album with Sacred Trash just before joining Kryst the Conqueror, which transformed itself into the newest incarnation of the Misfits
Dr. Chud recorded three studio albums, a live album, and a few singles with the Misfits and is also credited as a songwriter and producer for the band.

In addition to his work with the Misfits, Dr. Chud also played drums for Joey Ramone on the We Will Fall: A Tribute to Iggy Pop album, and Joey Ramone's only solo record Don't Worry About Me and also produced a recent Sardonica release Flip the Grill. After leaving the Misfits in 2000, Dr. Chud formed Graves.

In 2003, Dr. Chud formed a new band named Dr. Chud's X-Ward which released their debut multimedia album Diagnosis for Death in 2004 on the drummer's own record label Bloodwork Records.

In 2008, Dr. Chud joined up with Doyle Wolfgang von Frankenstein once again with his band Gorgeous Frankenstein on their second tour. The band was signed to Glenn Danzig's record label Evilive. In 2012 the band changed its name and recorded their first album together as "DOYLE" Abominator album, which Dr. Chud help produce and played all the drum tracks on. Dr. Chud left the band in 2014 to pursue other musical ventures.

In 2013, he recorded all the drum tracks for the Sonic Creeps album A Future Dead.

In 2016, Dr. Chud scored his first soundtrack for the documentary film "30 Years of Garbage" the Garbage Pail Kids story. It was released by Indican Films.

In 2010, he appeared on the television series LA Ink, starring Kat Von D. He received a tattoo of his famous stitches that he usually draws on his chest and back, circling his neck, by tattoo artist Amy Nicoletto. The tattoo was colored with black and gray ink.

Dr. Chud is known for making his own drumsticks and his signature drum set which is adorned with huge metal studded spikes.

Discography 
With Dan Kidney and the Pulsations
 Never Let Up
 Slice of Live
 Night People

With Specific Ocean
 Vinyl & Styrofoam

With Sardonica
 In Your Own Backyard

With Sacred Trash
 Sacred Trash

With Misfits
 American Psycho (1997) – LP
 "Dig Up Her Bones" (1997) – single
 Evillive II (1998) – fan club LP
 Scream! (1999) – single
 Famous Monsters (1999) – LP
 "Monster Mash" (1999) – Single
 Cuts from the Crypt (2001) – LP

With Graves
 Web of Dharma (2001) – LP

With Joey Ramone
 Don't Worry About Me (2002) – LP

With Dr. Chud's X-Ward
 Diagnosis for Death (2004) – LP

With Sonic Creeps
 A Future Dead (2013) – LP

With Doyle
 Abominator (2013) – LP

As Dr. Chud
 30 Years of Garbage (2017) – soundtrack
 "We're the Garbage Pail Kids" and "1980s Was So Great" CD single (2018)

References

External links 
 The Abominable Dr. Chud, official website

Musicians from New Jersey
Misfits (band) members
1964 births
Living people
People from Lodi, New Jersey
American punk rock drummers
American male drummers
Horror punk musicians
20th-century American drummers
American people of Italian descent
American heavy metal singers
American heavy metal drummers